Edmundo Sanders was an Argentine speaker and actor. He starred in the 1962 film Una Jaula no tiene secretos.

References

External links

Argentine male film actors
Possibly living people